The GCW Tag Team Championship is a professional wrestling world tag team championship created and promoted by the American promotion Game Changer Wrestling. Established on April 1, 1999 as JCW Tag Team Championship, the inaugural champions were Nick Niosi and Ricky O.  The current champions are The Motor City Machine Guns (Alex Shelley and Chris Sabin), who are in their first reign, both as a team and individually.

Title history 
There have been a total of 33 reigns and 5 vacancies shared between 26 different teams consisting of 48 distinctive champions. 

The current champions are The Motor City Machine Guns (Alex Shelley and Chris Sabin), who are in their first reign, both as a team and individually. They defeated Los Mazisos (Ciclope and Miedo Extremo) at Ransom on March 5, 2023, in Atlantic City, NJ.

Reigns

Combined reigns 

By team

By wrestler

References

External links 
 GCW Tag Team Title History at Cagematch.net

Tag team wrestling championships